Saint-Denis de La Chartre ( or ) was a Roman Catholic church building located on the Île de la Cité in Paris, France. It was demolished in 1810.

Location
It stood at the beginning of the Pont Notre-Dame in the corner of today's  and

History
Even though the church may have existed in the beginning of the 11th century, the current building was built in the 12th or 13th century in the alignment of the northern part of the former Gallo-Roman walls. It was surrounded by a small feudal plot. The church was the seat of one of the 14 parishes of La Cité that were founded in the mid-eleventh century.

The population of the parish was evaluated at 1,060 around 1300.

The parish was transferred to Saint Symphorien's in 1618 and merged with the parish of Sainte Madeleine in 1698.

The church was re-built in the 14th century and demolished in 1810.

References

Bibliography

 
 
 
 

Former Roman Catholic church buildings
Destroyed churches in France
Demolished buildings and structures in Paris
Île de la Cité
Buildings and structures demolished in 1810